"8×10" is a song written by Bill Anderson and Walter Haynes. It was first recorded by American country singer-songwriter Bill Anderson. It was released as a single in 1963 via Decca Records and became a major hit.

Background and release
"8×10" was recorded on July 1, 1963, at the Bradley Studio, located in Nashville, Tennessee. The sessions were produced by Owen Bradley, who would serve as Anderson's producer through most of years with Decca Records.

"8×10" was released as a single by Decca Records in August 1963. The single spent 23 weeks on the Billboard Hot Country Singles chart, peaking at number two in October 1963. It was Anderson's third single to place on the Billboard Hot 100, reaching number 53 around the same time frame. "8x10" was also his second (and final) single release to chart on the Billboard Adult Contemporary chart, where it reached number 18 in September 1963. It was later released on his 1964 studio album Bill Anderson Sings.

Track listings
7" vinyl single
 "8x10" – 2:48
 "One Mile Over - Two Miles Back" – 2:17

Chart performance

References

1963 singles
1963 songs
Bill Anderson (singer) songs
Decca Records singles
Song recordings produced by Owen Bradley
Songs written by Bill Anderson (singer)
Songs written by Walter Haynes